The Royal Victoria Hotel is a former hotel situated in Newport, Shropshire. It dates back to 1830 and gains its name from Queen Victoria, who as Princess Victoria of Kent visited the hotel in 1832 and who gifted the hotel with a pair of tortoise shells to commemorate the visit. The building has been extended over time and operated as a hotel, bar and restaurant before it finally closed in 2015.

History

It was originally called the Union, and built on the site of the Bear Inn.
Local people subscribed to the building project of the new Union, which was to be the principal hotel in the town, built with the fashionable five bays and two and a half storeys surmounted by a very shallow pediment of the period. The first manager was William Liddle who came from the Red Lion in Winchester. It was renamed in 1832 after the Princess Victoria visited it and she herself declared that it would now be called 'The Royal Victoria Hotel'.

The hotel grew to the rear after the demolition of the factories and workhouses, which were built along the back of the hotel.

The hotel grew further with the building of a ballroom and cocktail bar in 1910.  A second entrance from Water Lane was created for the use of people coming from the canal area, with Newport being on the main route to North Wales and Ireland.  Many notable people stayed in the hotel over the years, but a fire in 1974 destroyed most of the photographs and memorabilia, but it is believed that among the names to stay in the hotel were James Hain Friswell, Oliver Lodge and Charles Stewart Parnell.

The hotel closed in 2014, briefly reopened in 2015 before closing again. In 2017 permission was sought to redevelop the building as flats, retaining the facade while demolishing the rear extension. However work did not proceed as promised with delays blamed on legal issues and the Covid pandemic. The owners obtained further planning permission to develop it as 17 apartments in 2021.  It was still undeveloped, shorn up by scaffolding and complained of as an "eyesore" in February 2021 when a director of the property firm told BBC Radio Shropshire the building needed to be demolished, a route not allowed by the local authority Telford and Wrekin District Council, who reportedly did not want the building de-listed and demolished.

Architectural

The hotel is in stuccoed stone with a rusticated ground floor and quoins, above which is a frieze and a cornice.  At the top is a moulded eaves cornice, and the roof is tiled.  There are three storeys and five bays that are separated by pilasters with decorative capitals, and above the middle three bays is a pediment.  The central doorway has a Tuscan porch, and the windows are sashes.  In front of the hotel are forecourt railings. It is a Grade II Listed Building.

See also
Listed buildings in Newport, Shropshire

References

External links 
 Hotel website

Buildings and structures in Newport, Shropshire
Hotels in Shropshire
Hotel buildings completed in 1830
Hotels established in 1832
1830 establishments in England
Grade II listed buildings in Shropshire